Elections to Fermanagh District Council were held on 17 May 1989 on the same day as the other Northern Irish local government elections. The election used four district electoral areas to elect a total of 23 councillors.

Election results

Note: "Votes" are the first preference votes.

Districts summary

|- class="unsortable" align="centre"
!rowspan=2 align="left"|Ward
! % 
!Cllrs
! % 
!Cllrs
! %
!Cllrs
! %
!Cllrs
! %
!Cllrs
! %
!Cllrs
!rowspan=2|TotalCllrs
|- class="unsortable" align="center"
!colspan=2 bgcolor="" | UUP
!colspan=2 bgcolor="" | SDLP
!colspan=2 bgcolor="" | Sinn Féin
!colspan=2 bgcolor="" | DUP
!colspan=2 bgcolor="" | Workers' Party
!colspan=2 bgcolor="white"| Others
|-
|align="left"|Enniskillen
|bgcolor="40BFF5"|45.6
|bgcolor="40BFF5"|3
|13.5
|1
|14.2
|1
|10.5
|1
|12.6
|1
|3.6
|1
|7
|-
|align="left"|Erne East
|bgcolor="40BFF5"|37.3
|bgcolor="40BFF5"|3
|19.3
|1
|30.5
|2
|4.9
|0
|0.0
|0
|8.0
|0
|6
|-
|align="left"|Erne North
|bgcolor="40BFF5"|42.1
|bgcolor="40BFF5"|2
|27.7
|2
|10.4
|0
|19.8
|1
|0.0
|0
|0.0
|0
|5
|-
|align="left"|Erne West
|bgcolor="40BFF5"|33.4
|bgcolor="40BFF5"|2
|16.8
|1
|26.2
|1
|0.0
|0
|0.0
|0
|23.6
|1
|5
|- class="unsortable" class="sortbottom" style="background:#C9C9C9"
|align="left"| Total
|39.9
|10
|18.7
|5
|20.4
|4
|8.6
|2
|3.8
|1
|8.6
|1
|23
|-
|}

District results

Enniskillen

1985: 3 x UUP, 2 x Sinn Féin, 1 x SDLP, 1 x DUP
1989: 3 x UUP, 1 x Sinn Féin, 1 x SDLP, 1 x DUP, 1 x Workers' Party
1985-1989 Change: Workers' Party gain from Sinn Féin

Erne East

1985: 3 x Sinn Féin, 2 x UUP, 1 x SDLP
1989: 3 x UUP, 2 x Sinn Féin, 1 x SDLP
1985-1989 Change: UUP gain from Sinn Féin

Erne North

1985: 2 x UUP, 1 x SDLP, 1 x DUP, 1 x Sinn Féin
1989: 2 x UUP, 2 x SDLP, 1 x DUP
1985-1989 Change: SDLP gain from Sinn Féin

Erne West

1985: 2 x Sinn Féin, 1 x UUP, 1 x SDLP, 1 x IIP
1989: 2 x UUP, 1 x Sinn Féin, 1 x SDLP, 1 x Independent Nationalist
1985-1989 Change: UUP gain from Sinn Féin, Independent Nationalist leaves IIP

References

1989 Northern Ireland local elections
20th century in County Fermanagh
Fermanagh District Council elections